The  Kansas City Chiefs season was the franchise's strike-shortened 13th season in the National Football League  and the 23rd overall.

In May 1982, running back Joe Delaney underwent surgery to repair a detached retina in his eye, a radical procedure at the time. Optimism abounded at Arrowhead Stadium thanks to the club's promising 9–7 record from 1981, but swelling labor unrest from NFL players spelled doom for both the Chiefs and Levy in 1982. The Chiefs split their first two games of the year before a 57-day strike by the NFL Players Association began at midnight on September 20. The strike concluded on November 17 after seven games were canceled and one was rescheduled, but the Chiefs would never recover, losing four straight games after their return to the field. Center Jack Rudnay, who had been one of the franchise's most durable and decorated offensive performers over the past decade, announced on December 20 that he would retire after the season. The Chiefs finished the strike-shortened season at 3–6. Following the season, head coach Marv Levy was fired after going 31–42 in five seasons with zero playoff appearances.

Offseason

NFL draft

Personnel

Staff

Roster

Schedule

Preseason

Regular season

Note: Intra-division opponents are in bold text.

Game summaries

Week 1: at Buffalo Bills

Week 2: vs. San Diego Chargers

Week 11: at New Orleans Saints

Week 12: at Los Angeles Rams

Week 13: at Pittsburgh Steelers

Week 14: vs. Los Angeles Raiders

Week 15: at Denver Broncos

Week 16: vs. San Francisco 49ers

Week 17: vs. New York Jets

Standings

References

External links
 1982 Kansas City Chiefs at Pro-Football-Reference.com

Kansas City Chiefs
Kansas City Chiefs seasons
Kansas